The 2018 FireKeepers Casino 400 was a Monster Energy NASCAR Cup Series race held on June 10, 2018 at Michigan International Speedway in Brooklyn, Michigan. Contested over 133 of the scheduled 200 laps on the  D-shaped oval, it was the 15th race of the 2018 Monster Energy NASCAR Cup Series season.

This race was the 10th and final win for Clint Bowyer, who retired after the 2020 season.

Report

Background

The race was held at Michigan International Speedway, a  moderate-banked D-shaped speedway located in Brooklyn, Michigan. The track is used primarily for NASCAR events. It is sometimes known as a "sister track" to Texas World Speedway, and was used as the basis of Auto Club Speedway. The track is owned by International Speedway Corporation. Michigan International Speedway is recognized as one of motorsports' premier facilities because of its wide racing surface and high banking (by open-wheel standards; the 18-degree banking is modest by stock car standards).

Entry list

First practice

Qualifying

Qualifying results

Practice (post-qualifying)

Second practice

Final practice
Final practice session for Saturday was cancelled due to rain.

Race

Stage Results

Stage 1
Laps: 60

Stage 2
Laps: 60

Final Stage Results

Stage 3
Laps: 80

Race statistics
 Lead changes: 7 among different drivers
 Cautions/Laps: 8 for 30
 Red flags: 1
 Time of race: 2 hours, 00 minutes and 15 seconds
 Average speed:

Media

Television
Fox NASCAR televised the race in the United States on FOX for the seventh time at Michigan. Mike Joy was the lap-by-lap announcer, while three-time Michigan winner, Jeff Gordon and two-time winner Darrell Waltrip were the color commentators. Jamie Little, Regan Smith and Matt Yocum reported from pit lane during the race.

Radio 
Radio coverage of the race was broadcast by Motor Racing Network (MRN) and simulcasted on Sirius XM NASCAR Radio. Joe Moore, Jeff Striegle and five-time Michigan winner Rusty Wallace announced the race in the booth while the field is racing on the front stretch. Dave Moody called the race from a billboard outside of turn 2 when the field was racing through turns 1 and 2. Mike Bagley called the race from a platform outside of turn 3 when the field was racing through turns 3 and 4. Alex Hayden, Winston Kelley and Steve Post reported from pit lane during the race.

Standings after the race

Drivers' Championship standings

Manufacturers' Championship standings

Note: Only the first 16 positions are included for the driver standings.
. – Driver has clinched a position in the Monster Energy NASCAR Cup Series playoffs.

References

FireKeepers Casino 400
FireKeepers Casino 400
FireKeepers Casino 400
NASCAR races at Michigan International Speedway